Adam Wadecki (born 23 December 1977 in Elbląg, Poland) is a professional road racing cyclist. He entered professional cycling in 2000. He is the younger brother of professional cyclist, Piotr Wadecki.

Team membership

Palmarès

1999
3rd Warsaw–Łódź

2000
2nd GP Weltour
10th Lubelski Wyscig 3-Majowy

2001
1st Memoriał Andrzeja Trochanowskiego
1st Wyscig Po Ziemi Kaliskiej
1st Stage 2a Szlakiem Grodów Piastowskich

2002
1st Stage 3 Szlakiem Grodów Piastowskich
2nd Poreč Trophy VI
3rd Memorial Pawla Sosika
7th Poreč Trophy II
8th Poreč Trophy I

2003
5th Puchar Ministra Obrony Narodowej
6th Coupe des Carpathes

2004
1st Overall Dookoła Mazowsza
1st Stage 3
1st Puchar Ministra Obrony Narodewej
1st Stage 3a Tour de Slovaquie

2005
1st  National Road Race Championships
Course de la Solidarité Olympique
1st Stages 1, 3 & 4
1st Stage 5 Four Days of Dunkirk
10th Szlakiem Walk Majora Hubala

2006
3rd Pomorski Klasyk

2007
7th Pomorski Klasyk
8th Memorial Viviana Manservisi

2008
1st Stage 1 Dookoła Mazowsza
1st Stage 5 Tour de Slovaquie
7th Memoriał Andrzeja Trochanowskiego
8th Overall Szlakiem Walk Majora Hubala
1st Stage 4
8th Pomorski Klasyk
9th Overall Tour du Maroc
1st Stage 10
9th Tallinn–Tartu GP

2010
1st Stage 1 Course de la Solidarité Olympique
2nd Memoriał Andrzeja Trochanowskiego
5th Overall Dookoła Mazowsza
9th Pomerania Tour

2012
1st Stage 1 Dookoła Mazowsza
4th Memoriał Andrzeja Trochanowskiego
9th Banja Luka-Beograd I

2013
6th Puchar Ministra Obrony Narodowej
7th Memoriał Andrzeja Trochanowskiego

References

External links

Polish male cyclists
1977 births
Living people
People from Elbląg
Sportspeople from Warmian-Masurian Voivodeship